Yhi yindi is a species of amphipod crustacean, known only from Orpheus Island, Queensland, Australia. It was described in 1991 by J. Laurens Barnard and J. D. Thomas, and remains the only species in the genus Yhi.

References

Further reading

Gammaridea
Crustaceans of Australia
Crustaceans described in 1991